Tacana is a Western Tacanan language spoken by some 1,800 Tacana people in Bolivia out of an ethnic population of 5,000. They live in the forest along the Beni and Madre de Dios rivers in the north of La Paz Department. Numerous dialects, now extinct, have been attributed to Tacana:  Ayaychuna, Babayana, Chiliuvo, Chivamona, Idiama (Ixiama), Pamaino, Pasaramona, Saparuna, Siliama, Tumupasa (Maracani, "Tupamasa"), Uchupiamona, Yabaypura, and Yubamona (Mason 1950).

Phonology

Consonants

Vowels

External links

 Tacana dictionary online from IDS (select simple or advanced browsing)
Tacana (Intercontinental Dictionary Series)

Languages of Bolivia
Tacanan languages